Marcelo Rodrigues (born January 9, 1987), known as Marcelinho, is a Brazilian footballer who plays as a forward for Atlético Vega.

References

External links
 
 

1987 births
Living people
People from Santa Cruz do Sul
Brazilian footballers
Association football forwards
Grêmio Foot-Ball Porto Alegrense players
Associação Desportiva São Caetano players
Esporte Clube Juventude players
Bursaspor footballers
Sociedade Esportiva e Recreativa Caxias do Sul players
Avaí FC players
Clube Atlético Linense players
Bonsucesso Futebol Clube players
Guaratinguetá Futebol players
FC UTA Arad players
Boa Esporte Clube players
Esporte Clube São Luiz players
Brazil youth international footballers
Campeonato Brasileiro Série A players
Campeonato Brasileiro Série B players
Süper Lig players
Liga Dominicana de Fútbol players
Brazilian expatriate footballers
Expatriate footballers in Turkey
Expatriate footballers in Romania
Expatriate footballers in the Dominican Republic
Sportspeople from Rio Grande do Sul